Festuca longifolia, known in Britain and Ireland as blue fescue, is a species of grass which is native to Channel Islands and Southern Devon. It was described by Auquier in 1977.

References 

longifolia
Plants described in 1977
Biota of the Channel Islands